The 2000–01 EHF Champions League was the 41st edition of Europe's premier club handball tournament.

Round 1
{| class=wikitable style="text-align:center"
!width=200|Team #1
!width=50|Agg.
!width=200|Team #2
!width=100|1st match
!width=100|2nd match

Round 2
{| class=wikitable style="text-align:center"
!width=200|Team #1
!width=50|Agg.
!width=200|Team #2
!width=100|1st match
!width=100|2nd match

Group stage

Group A

Group B

Group C

Group D

Knockout stage

Quarterfinals

Semifinals

Finals

References

External links 
 EHF Champions League website

 
EHF Champions League seasons
Champions League
Champions League